Spooked can refer to:
 Spooked (album), a 2004 album by Robyn Hitchcock
 Spooked, a 1997 album by Pretty Maids
 Spooked (comics), a comic book published by Oni Press
 [[Spooked (film)|Spooked (film)]], a 2004 New Zealand film directed by Geoff Murphy
 "Spooked" (Fear Itself), a 2008 episode of the horror anthology Fear Itself "Spooked" (The Office), 2011 episode of American comedy series The Office Spooked: The Ghosts of Waverly Hills Sanatorium a 2006 Sci Fi Channel documentary filmed at Waverly Hills Sanatorium
 Spooked'', a 2014 webseries on Geek & Sundry and Hulu
 Spooked (podcast), a 2017 podcast presented by Glynn Washington's Snap Judgment